The English Men's Open Amateur Stroke Play Championship for the Brabazon Trophy is the national amateur stroke play golf championship in England (although entry is open to overseas golfers). It has been played annually since 1947 and is organised by the England Golf.

The format is 72 hole stroke play contested over four days. After 36 holes the leading 60 competitors and ties play a further 36 holes over the final two days.

History
In March 1938, John Moore-Brabazon was elected president of the English Golf Union. Early in 1939 a new EGU competition was announced, with a trophy presented by Moore-Brabazon. The event was to be a 72-hole strokeplay tournament to be played at Royal Liverpool from 4 to 6 October. Because of the start of World War II the event was cancelled. The idea was revived after the war and was first played in 1947 at Royal Birkdale Golf Club, called the English Golf Union president's trophy. It was won by Duncan Sutherland following an 18-hole playoff.

Before the 1948 event, the official name of the tournament was changed to the Brabazon Trophy, named after Moore-Brabazon, who had become Lord Brabazon in 1942. It was played at Royal Lytham and was won by Charlie Stowe, 7 strokes ahead of Gerald Micklem.

The first few events were, like the English Amateur, restricted to English golfers, but from 1951 it became an open event, amateur golfers from any part of the world being able to play.

Initially an 18-hole playoff was used if two or more players were tied after the 72 holes. However, after the 1963 event, playoffs were abandoned and the trophy was shared. The last tie was in 2007. Ties are now decided by a sudden-death playoff.

The first player to successfully defend the trophy was Ronnie White in 1950 and 1951, a feat which has been matched a further five times, Philip Scrutton (1954–55), Michael Bonallack (outright in 1968 and tied in 1969), Rodney Foster (tied 1969 and outright 1970), Gary Evans (tied 1990–91) and Neil Raymond (2011–12).

The tournament has received an increasingly international field over time, the first winner from outside of the British Isles was Neville Sundelson of South Africa in 1974. The tournament has subsequently been won (or tied) by international competitors on eight occasions.

The record for the most wins by a single individual is four (including one tie) held by Sir Michael Bonallack and won between 1964 and 1971. The tournament has twice been won by players who would go on to win a men's major championship, Sandy Lyle who won in 1977 would go on to win The Open Championship and the Masters Tournament and Charl Schwartzel who won in 2002 would go on to win the Masters.

The championship has never been played on the same course in consecutive years, however many of the host courses have hosted the tournament on multiple occasions with Royal Birkdale Golf Club, Royal Liverpool Golf Club, Moortown Golf Club and Hunstanton Golf Club having been used to host the competition on five occasions each.

Four golfers have won both the Brabazon Trophy and the Carris Trophy in the same year. The Carris Trophy is the equivalent event for under-18s. Patrick Hine (1949), Sandy Lyle (1975) and Peter Baker (1985) were each 17 years old when they won the Brabazon Trophy, while Ben Schmidt was 16 years old when he won both in 2019. Other under-18 winners of the Brabazon Trophy have been Ronan Rafferty, who was 16 when he was a joint-winner in 1980, and Charl Schwartzel who was 17 when he won in 2002. The George Henriques Salver is awarded to the leading player from Great Britain and Ireland under the age of 20. Henriques was president of the EGU in 1951. After his death in 1961 the salver was donated by his widow and first awarded in 1962.

Winners

Multiple winners
The following golfers have won (or tied) the Brabazon Trophy on more than one occasion

Venues by course
The championship has been hosted at several golf courses on multiple occasions

See also
English Amateur

References

External links
England Golf
List of winners

Amateur golf tournaments in the United Kingdom
Golf tournaments in England
1947 establishments in England
Recurring sporting events established in 1947